Tai Hing Estate is the second public housing estate and the oldest existing public housing estate in Tuen Mun, New Territories, Hong Kong. There are 8,602 flats on the estate with capacity to house 21,100 people.

It is also a district council constituency. It is a traditional strong pro-democratic area, having returned Albert Ho as district councillor in the Legislative Council.

History
Tai Hing Estate is the oldest existing public housing estate in Tuen Mun District. The site was previously farms near the coastline of Castle Peak Bay before the land reclamation of the bay for the construction of Tuen Mun New Town.

For the 60th anniversary of Hong Kong Scouting, the Scout Association of Hong Kong held the Diamond Jubilee Jamboree for 5000 Scouts, applying the theme World Harmony from 23 July 1971 to 29 July 1971 in present-day Tai Hing Estate in Castle Peak. The event was originally planned to be held from 22 July 1971 to 28 July 1971, but was pushed back one day later because of the typhoon attack to Hong Kong. The jamboree was seriously affected by the bad weather. The campsite was flooded and facilities were damaged. Campers had to retreat to San Fat Estate in Tuen Mun for shelter overnight. The Hong Kong Post Office issued a set of three stamps for the jamboree on 23 July.

Facilities
Tai Hing Estate is in Primary One Admission (POA) School Net 70. Within the school net are multiple aided schools (operated independently but funded with government money) and the following government schools: Tuen Mun Government Primary School (屯門官立小學).

There are five secondary schools, three primary schools, two kindergartens, a market, a public library, a swimming pool and a post office in Tai Hing.

Transport
There are two MTR Light Rail stations in Tai Hing, they are Tai Hing (North) stop and Tai Hing (South) stop. Both belong to Zone 2 for single-ride journeys.

Tai Hing (North) serves the northwestern part of the Tai Hing Estate
Tai Hing (South) serves the southeastern part of the estate.

There is an emergency platform on the reverse loop at Tai Hing North Station. A westbound Light Rail Vehicle can become an eastbound one via the loop and the emergency platform.

Houses

Covid pandemic 
Hing Ping House at the estate was placed under lockdown between 2 & 4 February, 2022.

References

Residential buildings completed in 1977
Residential buildings completed in 1980
Public housing estates in Hong Kong
Tuen Mun
Tuen Mun District
1977 establishments in Hong Kong
1980 establishments in Hong Kong